Women of the Movement is an American historical drama miniseries that premiered on ABC on January 6, 2022. Created by Marissa Jo Cerar, the series centers on Mamie Till-Mobley, played by Adrienne Warren, who devoted her life to seeking justice for her murdered son Emmett, played by Cedric Joe. Tonya Pinkins also co-stars as Alma Carthan, Emmett's grandmother.

The series is based on the book Emmett Till: The Murder That Shocked the World and Propelled the Civil Rights Movement by Devery S. Anderson. In August 2021 during post-production, the book Death of Innocence: The Story of the Hate Crime That Changed America by Mamie Till-Mobley and Christopher Benson, was also added to the project.

Background
In 1955, Mamie Till-Mobley's son Emmett Till was  murdered in Mississippi during the Jim Crow era. Her fight to get justice for him and to make sure he would not be forgotten would ultimately help to spawn the civil rights movement.

Cast and characters

Main
Adrienne Warren as Mamie Till-Mobley
Tonya Pinkins as Alma Carthan, Mamie's mother and Emmett's grandmother
Cedric Joe as Emmett "Bobo" Till
Glynn Turman as Rev. Mose Wright, Mamie's uncle
Ray Fisher as Gene Mobley. Mamie's boyfriend
Chris Coy as J. W. Milam, Roy's half-brother
Julia McDermott as Carolyn Bryant, Roy's wife
Carter Jenkins as Roy Bryant
Gary Basaraba as Sheriff Clarence Strider

Recurring
 Jamir Vega as Simeon Wright, Emmett's cousin
 Joshua Caleb Johnson as Wheeler Parker Jr.
 Leslie Silva as Ruby Hurley, the South-Western Director of the NAACP
 Chris Butler as Rayfield Mooty, a well-networked steel worker from Chicago who takes up Mamie's cause.
 Alex Désert as Dr. Theodore Roosevelt Howard
 Miles Fowler as Simeon Booker
 Tongayi Chirisa as Medgar Evers
 Jason Turner as James L. Hicks
 Daniel Abeles as Chet Packton
 Timothy Hutton as Jesse J. Breland, the prosecuting lawyer in Mississippi
 Gil Bellows as Gerald Chatham
 Vivian Fleming-Alvarez as Elizabeth "Lizzie" Wright, the wife of Mose
 Dan Byrd as Dan Wakefield
 Kevin Cutts as Sheriff Smith
 Jason Gaines as Johnny Whitten
 Jason Horgan as J.W. Kellum
 Ted Welch as Harvey Henderson
 Chip Lane as Judge Curtis Swango
 Deja Dee as Willie Mae
 Luke Hardeman as Maurice Wright
 Hudson Hurley as Roy Bryant Jr.
 Todd Barnett as Robert Smith
 Charlotte Haynes Hazzard as Mandy Bradley

Episodes

Production

Development
Jay-Z, Will Smith and Aaron Kaplan of Roc Nation, Overbrook Entertainment and Kapital Entertainment first tried to produce an untitled miniseries based on the life of Emmett Till at HBO in 2016. While at HBO, the group merged with Rosanna Grace and Nicole Tabs of Serendipity Group Inc, John P. Middleton and Alex Foster of The Middleton Media Group, and David Clark of Mazo Partners. When the project left HBO it was reconceived to focus on women during the civil rights movement. The series, now titled Women of the Movement, began development in April 2020.

On August 28, 2020, on the 65th anniversary of Emmett Till's murder, ABC gave the official green light to the series, with Marissa Jo Cerar coming on board as the writer and Gina Prince-Bythewood confirmed to direct the first episode of the series.

Casting
On October 16, 2020, Adrienne Warren was cast in a leading role of Mamie Till-Mobley. On November 13, 2020, Niecy Nash joined the series as Alma Carthan, Emmett Till's grandmother. On December 3, 2020, Cedric Joe joined the series as Emmett Till. On December 9, 2020, Glynn Turman joined the series as Mose Wright, Emmett Till's great uncle. On December 17, 2020, Ray Fisher joined the series as Gene Mobley, Mamie's husband. On January 6, 2021, it was announced that Tonya Pinkins had replaced Nash in the role of Alma Carthan. On January 11, 2021, Chris Coy, Julia McDermott and Carter Jenkins joined the series as J. W. Milam, Carolyn Bryant and Roy Bryant, respectively. On March 10, 2021, Joshua Caleb Johnson was cast in a recurring role. On April 13, 2021, Leslie Silva, Chris Butler, Alex Désert, Miles Fowler, Tongayi Chirisa, Jason Turner, and Daniel Abeles joined the cast in recurring roles. In June 2021, Gary Basaraba joined the cast. In August 2021, Timothy Hutton was cast in a recurring role.

Release
On October 21, 2021, ABC released a teaser trailer for the miniseries. The first two episodes premiered on January 6, 2022.

Reception

Critical response
The review aggregator website Rotten Tomatoes reported an 89% approval rating with an average rating of 6.8/10, based on 19 critic reviews. The website's critics consensus reads, "Women of the Movement enlivens the tragedy of Emmett Till with solid storytelling and a deeply moving pair of performances by Adrienne Warren and Cedric Joe."  Metacritic, which uses a weighted average, assigned a score of 71 out of 100 based on 15 critics, indicating "generally favorable reviews".

Ratings

Accolades

See also
 Civil rights movement in popular culture
 Till, also released in 2022

References

External links
 
 

2020s American black television series
2020s American drama television miniseries
2022 American television series debuts
2022 American television series endings
American Broadcasting Company original programming
Civil rights movement in television
Cultural depictions of American women
Emmett Till in fiction
English-language television shows
Television series by Kapital Entertainment
Television series by Roc Nation
Television series set in 1955
Television shows based on non-fiction books
Television shows set in Mississippi